Prince William County Public Schools is a Virginian school division with its headquarters in the Kelly Leadership Center in unincorporated Prince William County, Virginia. As of the 2010 census, the population of the county was 402,002.

Prince William County Public Schools is the second largest school division in Virginia enrolling approximately 92,000 students.  Prince William County Public Schools is the fourth largest school system in the Washington Metropolitan Area after the Fairfax County, Virginia; Montgomery County, Maryland; and Prince George's County, Maryland school systems.

The county system serves all parts of the county except for Marine Corps Base Quantico, which is served by the Department of Defense Education Activity (DoDEA).

Administration

Superintendent 
A recent superintendent of Prince William County Public Schools was Steven L. Walts. He became the superintendent in 2005. Walts was previously superintendent of the Greece Central School District. He was also an assistant superintendent in Baltimore County Public Schools. Walts retired at the end of the 2020-21 school year.

On March 24, 2021, Prince William County Public Schools announced that the next superintendent will be LaTanya McDade. McDade is the Chief Education Officer for Chicago Public Schools. She is the first woman and first African-American superintendent in the district's history.

School Board 
Prince William County Schools is governed by elected members to the school board. One member from each of the 7 Magisterial districts in Prince William County and a Chairmen At-Large are elected to serve on the board. The Vice is elected by the board. Two non voting Student Representative are selected each school year to serve and provide input from a students perspective on decisions made by the school board. A Student Senate is made up of one student from each high school who applied for the student representative position. They work together with the student representatives to advise the school board.

Schools

High schools
Battlefield High School 
 Haymarket, Virginia
 Principal: Ryan Ferrera
 Mascot: Bobcats
Brentsville District High School 
 Nokesville, Virginia
 Principal: Katherine Meints
 Mascot: Tigers
Colgan High School 
 Manassas, Virginia
 Principal:Tim Healey
 Mascot: Sharks
Named after State Senator Charles J. Colgan

Forest Park High School 
 Woodbridge, Virginia
 Principal: Richard Martinez
 Mascot: Bruins
Freedom High School 
 Woodbridge, Virginia
 Principal: Chevelli Smith
 Mascot: Eagles
Gainesville High School 
 Gainesville, Virginia
 Principal: Neil Beech
 Mascot: Cardinals
Gar-Field High School

 Woodbridge, Virginia
 Principal: Matthew Mathison
 Mascot: Red Wolves
Hylton High School
Woodbridge, Virginia
 Principal: Cassandra Crawford
 Mascot: Bulldogs
Named after real estate developer Cecil D. Hylton
Osbourn Park High School 
 Manassas, Virginia
 Principal: Lisamarie Kane
 Mascot: Yellow Jackets
Patriot High School

 Nokesville, Virginia
 Principal: Michael Bishop
 Mascot: Pioneers
Potomac High School

 Dumfries, Virginia
 Principal: Brandon Boles
 Mascot: Panthers
Unity Reed High School
 Manassas, Virginia
 Principal: Richard Nichols
 Mascot: Lions
 Named after Arthur Reed

Woodbridge High School
 Woodbridge, Virginia
 Principal: Heather Abney
 Mascot: Vikings

Specialty programs
The Biotechnology Center is located at Osbourn Park High School. Osbourn Park also offers specialty programs through their automotive program, firefighting program, Navy JROTC, practical nursing program, project lead-the-way, and the pre-governors school program.

The Cambridge Programme offers a curriculum and examination system with external assessments by the University of Cambridge International Examinations. Juniors and seniors taking advanced-level courses can qualify for an Advanced International Certificate of Education (AICE) diploma. Available at Potomac Senior High School and Brentsville District High School.

The Center for the Fine and Performing Arts is located at Charles J. Colgan, Sr. High School since the school's opening; Woodbridge Senior High School hosted it up to 2016.

The Center for Information Technology is located at Battlefield High School and Forest Park High School.

The Center for International Studies and Languages is located at Hylton High School.

The International Baccalaureate Diploma Programme, a rigorous four-year academic program authorized by the International Baccalaureate (IB) of Geneva, Switzerland.  Available at Unity Reed High School and Gar-Field Senior High School.

The Pathways to Global Citizenship program will be located at Gainesville High School

Middle schools
Louise A. Benton Middle School

 Manassas, Virginia
 Principal: Joseph Graczyk
 Mascot: Cougars
Named after teacher and public servant Louise A. Benton

Stuart M. Beville Middle School

 Woodbridge, Virginia
 Principal: Tim Keenan
 Mascot: Bobcats
Named after former Superintendent of Prince William County Public School Stuart McGuire Beville

Bull Run Middle School

 Gainesville, Virginia
 Principal: Matthew Phythian
 Mascot: Eagles

Fred M. Lynn Middle School

 Woodbridge, Virginia
 Principal: Inmar Romero
 Mascot: Hornets
Named after former school board member Fred M. Lynn

Gainesville Middle School

 Gainesville, Virginia
 Principal: Mary Kate Graham
 Mascot: Hawks

Graham Park Middle School

 Triangle, Virginia
 Principal: Yushica T. Walker
 Mascot: Lions

George M. Hampton Middle School (Formerly Mills E. Godwin Middle School)

 Woodbridge, Virginia
 Principal: Jehovanni Mitchell
 Mascot: Huskies
Named after Virginia Governor Mills E. Godwin
Renamed after Lieutenant Colonel George M. Hampton 

Lake Ridge Middle School

 Woodbridge, Virginia
 Principal: James Dutrow
 Mascot: Wolves

E.H. Marsteller Middle School

 Bristow, Virginia
 Principal: Lisa Warner
 Mascot: Bulldogs
Named after Dr. Emlyn Harrison Marsteller

Parkside Middle School

 Manassas, Virginia
 Principal: Mary Jane Boynton
 Mascot: Panthers

Potomac Middle School

 Dumfries, Virginia
 Principal: Rachel Preston
 Mascot: Panthers

Potomac Shores Middle School
 Dumfries, Virginia
 Principal: Joe Murgo
Mascot: Seahawks

Ronald Wilson Reagan Middle School

 Haymarket, Virginia
 Principal: Chris Beemer
 Mascot: Mustangs
Named after President Ronald Reagan

Rippon Middle School

 Woodbridge, Virginia
 Principal: Scott R. Bergquist
 Mascot: Raiders

Herbert J. Saunders Middle School

 Manassas, Virginia
 Principal: Matthew Eline
 Mascot: Spartans
Named after former Superintendent of Prince William County Public Schools Herbert J. Saunders

Unity Braxton Middle School

 Manassas, Virginia
 Principal: Mike P. Nicely
 Mascot: Jaguars
 Named after Celestine and Carroll Braxton

Woodbridge Middle School

 Woodbridge, Virginia
 Principal: Angela Owens
 Mascot: Seminoles

Specialty programs
Graham Park, Marsteller, and Rippon Middle Schools currently offer  Middle School Mathematics and Science Program, an intensive program in mathematics and science.

Beville, Hampton, Lynn, Parkside, and Unity Braxton Middle Schools offer the International Baccalaureate Middle Years Programme (IBMYP).

Lynn, Lake Ridge, and Parkside Middle Schools offer the Middle School World Languages Program in French and Spanish.

Gainesville Middle School offers an Arts and Sciences Program.

Traditional Schools (K-8) 
The Nokesville School

 Nokesville, Virginia
 Principal: Eric Worcester 
 Mascot: Tigers

Pennington Traditional School

 Manassas, Virginia
 Principal: Amanda McCulla 
 Mascot: Blue Jays 
 Named after Philip Michael Pennington, a Prince William County police officer who died in the line of duty.

Mary G. Porter Traditional School

 Woodbridge, Virginia
 Principal: Kaitlyn Engelmeier-Foor 
Mascot: Patriots
 Named after Mary G. Porter, an African-American teacher who helped desegregate Dumfries Elementary School.

Elementary schools 
J.W. Alvey Elementary School

 Haymarket, Virginia
 Principal: Amber Macerelli
 Mascot: Sunrays
Named after Prince William County leader James W. Alvey

Antietam Elementary School

 Woodbridge, Virginia
 Principal: Marcia Wieduwilt 
Mascot: Mighty Mustangs

Ashland Elementary School

 Manassas, Virginia
 Principal: Andy Jaks 
Mascot: Falcons

Bel Air Elementary School

 Woodbridge, Virginia
 Principal: Antoinette J. McDonald 
 Mascot: Panthers

Belmont Elementary School

 Woodbridge, Virginia
 Principal: Karen Giacometti 
 Mascot: Eagles

Maitland C. Bennett Elementary School

 Manassas, Virginia
 Principal: Melissa Scott
Mascot: Bears
Named after Dr. Maitland C. Bennett 

Bristow Run Elementary School

 Bristow, Virginia
 Principal: Rhonda Jeck 
Mascot: Panthers

Buckland Mills Elementary School

 Gainesville, Virginia
 Principal: Kelle Stroud 
Mascot: Wildcats

Cedar Point Elementary School

 Bristow, Virginia
 Principal: Mark Marinoble 
Mascot: Cheetahs

Chris Yung Elementary School

 Bristow, Virginia
 Principal: Kathy Notyce 
Mascot: Steam Engines
Named after Officer Chris Yung 

Coles Elementary School

 Manassas, Virginia
 Principal: Kathryn Forgas 
Mascot: Roadrunners

Covington-Harper Elementary School

 Dumfries, Virginia
 Principal: Ivania Siero
Mascot: Cheetahs
Named after Betty D. Covington and John Harper 

Dale City Elementary School

 Woodbridge, Virginia
 Principal: Cindy Crowe-Miller 
 Mascot: Tigers

Dumfries Elementary School

 Dumfries, Virginia
 Principal: Starr Granby
Mascot: Dragons

Suella Gilbert Ellis Elementary School

 Manassas, Virginia
 Principal: Laura Gazda 
Mascot: Explorers
Named after the first African-American administrator in Prince William County, Suella Gilbert Ellis 

Enterprise Elementary School

 Woodbridge, Virginia
 Principal: Kelly Nickerson 
 Mascot: Rockets

Featherstone Elementary School

 Woodbridge, Virginia
 Principal: Daria Groover 
 Mascot: Falcons

Fannie W. Fitzgerald Elementary School

 Woodbridge, Virginia
 Principal: George Wright
 Named after Prince William County educator Fannie Wilkinson Fitzgerald 

Glenkirk Elementary School

 Gainesville, Virginia
 Principal: Marisa Miranda 
Mascot: Golden Knights

Samuel L. Gravely Elementary School

 Haymarket, Virginia
 Principal: Michael Kelchlin 
 Mascot: Seadogs
Named after Admiral Samuel L. Gravely, Jr.

Haymarket Elementary School

 Haymarket, Virginia
 Principal: Scott Baldwin 
 Mascot: Cubs

Alexander Henderson Elementary School

 Dumfries, Virginia
 Principal: Amy Schott
Mascot: Huskies

John D. Jenkins Elementary School

 Woodbridge, Virginia
 Principal: Xanthe McFadden
 Mascot: Yellow Jackets
 Named after the longest-serving member in the history of the Prince William Board of County Supervisors, John D. Jenkins 

Kerrydale Elementary School

 Woodbridge, Virginia
 Principal: Ms. Alyse Zeffiro 
 Mascot: Cardinals

R. Dean Kilby Elementary School

 Woodbridge, Virginia
 Principal: Karen Najjum
 Mascot: Tigers
 Named after the school's first principal, R. Dean Kilby 

Martin Luther King, Jr. Elementary School

 Woodbridge, Virginia
 Principal: Amy Larsen 
 Mascot: Lions
 Named after Martin Luther King Jr.

Lake Ridge Elementary School

 Woodbridge, Virginia
 Principal: Sarah Harrington 
 Mascot: Lions

Leesylvania Elementary School

 Woodbridge, Virginia
 Principal: Margaret MacGregor 
 Mascot: Eagles

Loch Lomond Elementary School

 Manassas, Virginia
 Principal: Vineeth Lagouit
Mascot: Scotties

Thurgood Marshall Elementary School

 Manassas, Virginia
 Principal: Kris Waldrop 
Mascot: Eagles

Marumsco Hills Elementary School

 Woodbridge, Virginia
 Principal: Julie Cuocci 
 Mascot: Eagles

Sharon C. McAuliffe Elementary School

 Woodbridge, Virginia
 Principal: Janice Herritt 
 Mascot: Challengers
 Named after astronaut and teacher Sharon Christa McAuliffe

Minnieville Elementary School

 Woodbridge, Virginia
 Principal: Deborah Ellis 
 Mascot: Eagles

Montclair Elementary School

 Dumfries, Virginia
 Principal: Amanda Parks 
Mascot: Cardinals

Mountain View Elementary School

 Haymarket, Virginia
 Principal: Adriane Harrison 
 Mascot: Cougars

Mullen Elementary School

 Manassas, Virginia
 Principal: Rhonda Ellington 
Mascot: Shamrocks

Neabsco Elementary School

 Woodbridge, Virginia
 Principal: Chris Tsang 
 Mascot: Stars

Occoquan Elementary School

 Woodbridge, Virginia
 Principal: Buddy Lint 
 Mascot: Braves

Old Bridge Elementary School

 Woodbridge, Virginia
 Principal: Alyssa Francisco 
 Mascot: Dolphins

John F. Pattie, Sr. Elementary School

 Dumfries, Virginia
 Principal: Robert J. Lucciotti 
Mascot: Panthers

Sonnie P. Penn Elementary School

 Woodbridge, Virginia
 Principal: Elliot Bolles 
 Mascot: Panthers
 Named after former Assistant Principal at Enterprise Elementary, and community youth leader and mentor, Sonnie P. Penn 

Piney Branch Elementary School

 Bristow, Virginia
 Principal: Steve Thorne
Mascot: Cardinals

Potomac View Elementary School

 Woodbridge, Virginia
 Principal: Latiesa Green 
 Mascot: Ponies

River Oaks Elementary School

 Woodbridge, Virginia
 Principal: Aerica A. Williams 
 Mascot: Dolphins

Rockledge Elementary School

 Woodbridge, Virginia
 Principal: Nikki Steptoe-Coleman
 Mascot: Eagles

Rosa Parks Elementary School

 Woodbridge, Virginia
 Principal: Susan Danielson 
 Mascot: Golden Eagles
 Named after Rosa Parks

Signal Hill Elementary School

 Manassas, Virginia
 Principal: Carrie Webb
Mascot: Pandas

Charles A. Sinclair Elementary School

 Manassas, Virginia
 Principal: Heather Goode 
Mascot: Eagles
Named after former Prince William County Treasurer and Mayor of Manassas, Charles A. Sinclair 

Springwoods Elementary School

 Woodbridge, Virginia
 Principal: Janeene Mainor 
 Mascot: Eagles

Sudley Elementary School

 Manassas, Virginia
 Principal: Kevin Conroy
Mascot: Eagles

Swans Creek Elementary School

 Southbridge, Virginia
 Principal: Amanda Whitney 
Mascot: Swans

T. Clay Wood Elementary School

 Nokesville, Virginia
 Principal: Andrew Buchheit
Mascot: Timberwolves

Triangle Elementary School

 Triangle, Virginia
 Principal: Geoffrey Deavers 
Mascot: Tigers

George Grayson Tyler Elementary School

 Gainesville, Virginia
 Principal: Jennifer Perilla 
Mascot: Tomcats
Named after Superintendent George Grayson Tyler 

Elizabeth Vaughan Elementary School

 Woodbridge, Virginia
 Principal: Mark A. Boyd 
 Mascot: Wildcats

Victory Elementary School

 Bristow, Virginia
 Principal: Christopher Wray 
 Mascot: Westies

West Gate Elementary School

 Manassas, Virginia
 Principal: Julie Svendsen 
Mascot: Bulldogs

Westridge Elementary School

 Woodbridge, Virginia
 Principal: Laurence Khan 
 Mascot: Knights

Mary Williams Elementary School

 Dumfries, Virginia
 Principal: Danna Johnson 
 Mascot: Panther Cubs
 Named after educator Mary F. Williams 

Kyle R. Wilson Elementary School

 Woodbridge, Virginia
 Principal: Gretchen Drzewucki 
 Mascot: Sea Lions
 Named after firefighter Kyle R. Wilson 

Yorkshire Elementary School

 Manassas, Virginia
 Principal: Lyn Marsilio 
Mascot: Bulldogs

Specialty programs
Elementary Foreign/World Languages Programs are available at Enterprise, Mullen, River Oaks, Tyler, Lake Ridge and Signal Hill elementary schools.

Elementary Mathematics and Science Program  are available at Belmont and Sudley elementary Schools.

International Baccalaureate Primary Years Programme (PYP) are in the consideration phase at Antietam, Buckland Mills, Dumfries, Ellis, Featherstone, Parks, Victory, and Williams elementary schools.

Pennington School and Porter School, both schools of choice and serving students in grades 1 through 8, provide Traditional Schools Serving Students at the Elementary and Middle School Levels.

Other

Prince William County provides an "alternative" school service for what they deem as "troubled teens". Students who become pregnant, sell or use drugs, write graffiti, have general behavioral issues or are prone to violence are usually sent to learn together in the same facility, regardless of their base school. The PACE program targets students with more extreme cases of psychological issues.

Independent Hill School/PACE East, special education school for middle & high school students
New Directions Alternative School, special school for students who are not successful in their base school
New Dominion Alternative School, special school for middle school students
PACE West, a special education school providing services to students with serious emotional and behavior problems
Pennington Traditional School, rigorous school for first through eighth graders [Formerly a high school, grades 9-12]
Porter Traditional School, specialty school for first through eighth graders
Woodbine Preschool Center, a center for preschool-aged children with developmental disabilities
East End Alternative, now defunct. Previously located at a Woodbridge Boys and Girls Club. The student body was migrated to Pennington Alternative School in the mid-1990s.

Schools of excellence
Prince William County Public Schools honors schools as Schools of Excellence based on a variety of criteria, including: performance targets; Adequate Yearly Progress under the No Child Left Behind Act; Virginia Wellness Tests; school attendance rates; and parent, student, and teacher satisfaction.  The Virginia state Standards of Learning (SOL) tests for both students on grade level and students below grade level are also considered.  In 2006, the  criteria were adjusted to reflect the continuous improvement of the system's schools.

School administration and staff are presented with a commemorative flag, a plaque, and a check to be used at the school's discretion. Schools receive $1,000 for each year the School of Excellence designation is obtained.

See also
List of school divisions in Virginia

References

External links
Prince William County Public Schools
School Directory
Official Website of Prince William County Government

County government agencies in Virginia
School divisions in Virginia
Northern Virginia
Public Schools